St. Luke's Greek Orthodox Cathedral is a cathedral of the Greek Orthodox Church in the Dowanhill district of Glasgow, Scotland.

History

Belhaven U.P. Church
The church was designed by James Sellars and built in 1877 as the Belhaven Church for the United Presbyterian Church of Scotland. The church was built in Norman Gothic style, inspired by Dunblane Cathedral. The congregation became part of the Church of Scotland in 1929 and continued to meet there until 1960.

A prominent feature of the church is the collection of stained glass windows designed by Stephen Adam which depict scenes from the Old and New Testament.

Orthodoxy
Following the amalgamation of Behaven Church with a neighbouring congregation, the Belhaven Church building was no longer needed by the Church of Scotland. It was converted to a Greek Orthodox Church; the work was paid for by Sir Reo Stakis. Stakis had also paid for the first (much smaller) Greek Orthodox church in the city, in 1953.

On 24 May 1970 the Patriarch Nicholas VI of Alexandria, who was attending the General Assembly of the Church of Scotland, visited St. Luke's and elevated it to the status of a Cathedral, with the blessing of the Ecumenical Patriarchate of Constantinople. This occasion is commemorated with a marble plaque, inscribed with gold lettering, at the right side of the entrance hall.

On Sunday 7 July 1996 the cathedral was visited by the Ecumenical Patriarch Bartholomew I of Constantinople, who celebrated the Divine Liturgy.

Other cathedrals
The other cathedrals in Glasgow are St. Andrew's Cathedral (Roman Catholic) and St. Mary's Cathedral (Episcopalian). Glasgow Cathedral (Church of Scotland) is also in Glasgow, but it is not a Cathedral Church, as it is no longer the seat of a bishop.

Nearby churches include:
Jordanhill Parish Church (Church of Scotland)
Kelvinside Hillhead Parish Church (Church of Scotland)
St. John's Renfield Church (Church of Scotland)
St. Mary's Cathedral (Scottish Episcopal Church)
Wellington Church (Church of Scotland)

References

External links
Website of the Greek Orthodox Cathedral of St. Luke

Churches completed in 1877
19th-century Eastern Orthodox church buildings
Category B listed buildings in Glasgow
Luke's
Tourist attractions in Glasgow
Listed cathedrals in Scotland
James Sellars buildings
Church buildings converted to a different denomination
Hillhead
Greek Orthodox cathedrals in the United Kingdom
Eastern Orthodoxy in Scotland
Cathedrals in Scotland
Listed churches in Glasgow
1877 establishments in Scotland